Eirik Ulltang (born April 19, 1990 in Kristiansand, Norway) is a Norwegian professional trials rider. He competes for Hardanger Sykkelklubb, and he's the first and so far only rider at the Norwegian National Trials Team. His best ranking was 11th in the world. He was the first Norwegian participating in a trials world cup. Ulltang was the first to ride up the entire trail that leads to the Pulpit Rock (Preikestolen), and also the first to jump the Svolvær Goat with a bike and Ridderspranget with a bike

Achievements 
This is a complete list of Ulltang's race results in Norwegian cup, world cup and championships.

Norwegian cup 
Eirik Ulltang won the first ever Norwegian cup. He won the overall in 2012, 2013, 2014, 2015, 2016, 2017, 2018 and 2019.

Norwegian Championship 
Eirik is the first official Norwegian champion in trials.

European Championship

World championship

World cup 
Eirik Ulltang was the first Norwegian that competed in the UCI Trials World Cup. His best result is a 12th place.

The table is an overview over single race results in the worldcup.

References

External links 
 

1990 births
Living people
Norwegian male cyclists
Sportspeople from Kristiansand
People from Kvam
Mountain bike trials riders